Physical Review A (also known as PRA) is a monthly peer-reviewed scientific journal published by the American Physical Society covering atomic, molecular, and optical physics and quantum information.  the editor was Jan M. Rost (Max Planck Institute for the Physics of Complex Systems).

History 
In 1893, the Physical Review was established at Cornell University. It was taken over by the American Physical Society (formed in 1899) in 1913. In 1970, Physical Review was subdivided into Physical Review A, B, C, and D. At that time section A was subtitled Physical Review A: General Physics. In 1990 a process was started to split this journal into two, resulting in the creation of Physical Review E in 1993.  Hence, in 1993, Physical Review A changed its statement of scope to Atomic, Molecular and Optical Physics. In January 2007, the section of Physical Review E that published papers on classical optics was merged into Physical Review A, unifying the classical and quantum parts of optics into a single journal. In 2016, Physical Review A broadened its formal statement of coverage to explicitly include quantum information, which has been a section within the journal since 1998.

Rapid Communications 
Physical Review A Rapid Communications was introduced in 1981 to provide a venue for quick publication of high-impact articles similar to Physical Review Letters, but for a more specialized audience. As of May 1, 2012, the editors have made more explicit the requirement for significance in Rapid articles. In addition, as of March 8, 2010, the editors have placed newly published Rapid Communications articles on rotation as highlights on the Physical Review A website, so as to give them more visibility.

Editors' Suggestions 
In August 2013, Physical Review A started marking a small number of papers published in the journal which the editors find to be of particular interest, importance, or clarity as Editors’ Suggestions  to give them higher visibility.

Abstracting and indexing 
 Physical Review journals were abstracted and indexed in:
Chemical Abstracts Service/CASSI
Inspec
Clarivate Web of Science
Google Scholar
INSPIRE-HEP
NASA Astrophysics Data System (ADS)
PubMed
Scopus
According to the Journal Citation Reports, the journal had an impact factor of 3.989 in 2020.

References

External links 
 

Publications established in 1970
English-language journals
Quantum information science
Optics journals
American Physical Society academic journals
Monthly journals